The Black College Football Hall of Fame (BCFHOF) is an American hall of fame for college football players, coaches and contributors from historically black colleges and universities (HBCUs). It was founded in 2009 in Atlanta, centrally located to many of the country's black universities. Its museum is located within the Pro Football Hall of Fame in Canton, Ohio. Players are eligible for induction if they played at least two seasons at an HBCU and finished their college career at an HBCU. They can be nominated five years after their last college season. Any current or former head coach of an HBCU is eligible. Anyone can be nominated as a contributor.

History 
The BCFHOF was co-founded by James Harris and Doug Williams, former quarterbacks who both played football at the historically black university Grambling State University before playing professionally. As a rookie with the Buffalo Bills in 1969, Harris become the first black quarterback to be the starter in a season opener in either the American Football League or the National Football League (NFL). Williams was the first black quarterback to play in a Super Bowl, starting for the Washington Redskins and winning Super Bowl XXII while being named the Super Bowl MVP.

At its inception in 2009, the BCFHOF did not have a building. Its induction ceremonies and educational programs were held at various hotels in Atlanta. In 2016, the Pro Football Hall of Fame announced that it was providing a permanent home for the BCFHOF. The exhibit officially opened in 2019, held on the same weekend as the inaugural Black College Football Hall of Fame Classic at Tom Benson Hall of Fame Stadium in Canton. The BCFHOF continues to run independently with its board of directors and choosing its inductees.

In 2021, the BCFHOF partnered with the NFL, Pro Football Hall of Fame and Tulane University to establish the HBCU Legacy Bowl, a postseason all-star game for NFL Draft-eligible players from HBCUs.

Inductees

Source:

Inductees by school

See also
College Football Hall of Fame

Notes

References

External links

African Americans and sport
American football museums and halls of fame
College football awards
College sports halls of fame in the United States
Sports and historically black universities and colleges in the United States
Sports organizations established in 2009